Long Island is one of the many uninhabited Canadian arctic islands in Qikiqtaaluk Region, Nunavut.

References

Islands of Hudson Bay
Uninhabited islands of Qikiqtaaluk Region